Chen Kuiyuan (born January 1941) is a former Chinese politician. In a lengthy public career, Chen served variously as the vice chairman of Chinese People's Political Consultative Conference (CPPCC), the president and the Party chief of Chinese Academy of Social Sciences, and party chief of Tibet Autonomous Region and Henan province. He retired in 2013.

Career
Born in Kangping, Liaoning Province, Chen graduated from Inner Mongolia Normal College, majoring political education. He joined the Communist Party of China in May 1965. After graduation in 1964, Chen was assigned to work in the CPC party school in Hulunbuir of Inner Mongolia Autonomous Region. He later served in various posts in Hulunbuir and eventually became the Party chief of local CPC committee. In 1989, Chen became a standing member of CPC Inner Mongolia committee, and the secretary of commission for higher institutions of the autonomous region. In 1991, he was elevated to the vice chairman of Inner Mongolia Autonomous Region. In January 1992, Chen was transferred to Tibet Autonomous Region and became the Deputy Party Secretary. In November of that year, Chen succeeded Hu Jintao as the secretary of CPC Tibet committee, essentially the top official of Tibet. 

After 8 years tenure in Tibet, Chen was transferred to Henan Province in 2000, and served as secretary of CPC Henan committee. In January 2003, Chen was appointed as the president and leader of Party group of Chinese Academy of Social Sciences. In March of the same year, he was elected the vice chairman of 10th CPPCC, and was re-elected in March 2008.

Chen was a member of 14th, 15th, 16th, and 17th Central Committees of the Communist Party of China.

References

|- 

|-

1941 births
Living people
Inner Mongolia Normal University alumni
People's Republic of China politicians from Liaoning
Politicians from Shenyang
Political office-holders in Tibet
CCP committee secretaries of Henan
Chinese Communist Party politicians from Liaoning
Vice Chairpersons of the National Committee of the Chinese People's Political Consultative Conference